Chandunath G. Nair, professionally credited as Chandhunadh, is an Indian actor who appears in Malayalam cinema.

Early life
His father retired as a forest range officer and mother was a Hindi language professor at University of Kerala. Chandhunadh hails from Thiruvananthapuram. He went to college at Mar Ivanios College for bachelor's degree and to Christ University, Bangalore for post-graduation. He took master's degree in English language and literature. He also took M. Phil. Later, he worked as an English teacher at schools and colleges at Bangalore and Thiruvananthapuram, while simultaneously working in theatre too at these academies. He was a theatre instructor teaching acting skills. He has also scripted English plays. He was an active member of a theatre alumni collective called Kanal Samskarika Vedi. Before debuting in films he was in Bangalore for four years.

Career

Chandhunath made his film debut with Himalayathile Kashmalan (2017) directed by Abhiram Suresh Unnithan, his college mate. He originally won the audition for a big budget film by Abhiram, but that film did not materialize. But he was subsequently cast in Abhiram's debut directorial Himalayathile Kashmalan. For his second film Pathinettam Padi (2019), he was initially selected as an assistant director by Shankar Ramakrishnan. But after seeing him taking workshops for the debutant actors in the film, he was cast in the role of Joy Abraham Palackal, a teacher and brother of Mammootty's character. In 2022, he dubbed for the Malayalam version of K.G.F: Chapter 2 for the character Anand Ingalagi played by Ashok Sharma. He played one among the 12 principal characters in the crime thriller 12th Man, released on Disney+ Hotstar. He also worked in Paappan, Twenty One Gms and CBI 5: The Brain. He is set to appear in Jeethu Joseph's upcoming film, Ram. He plays the role of a journalist in the film.

Personal life
Chandhunadh is married to Swathy, his college girlfriend at Mar Ivanios College. She is a singer and a former contestant in the reality TV singing talent show Idea Star Singer. They have a son named Neelamsh. In 2020, they released Swa, a mashup music video of songs of Vidyasagar, produced by Chandhunath and sung by Swathy.

Filmography

References

External links

Male actors in Malayalam cinema
Living people
Year of birth missing (living people)